Mijo Dadić (born 15 October 1981 in Rijeka) is a Croatian retired football player. He played for Pelita Bandung Raya in the Indonesia Super League among others.

Careers
At 6 ft 2 in this towering rock in the heart of UPB-MyTeam FC’s defence, cuts an imposing figure in the backline amongst his opponents. A former Croatian National Junior, Mijo Dadić is the pillar of strength with great aerial ability that makes him one of the most consistent performers in the team. He first made his mark in Malaysia with MK Land FC, before returning in 2006 as part of coach Bojan Hodak’s foreign recruits in UPB-MyTeam FC’s Malaysian Premier League debut.

Mijo Dadić, the youngest in a family of five, loved the game since he was a kid and was enrolled in a football school at his birthplace in Rijeka at the age of 7. Despite having no football blood in the family, his father is retired and his mother is a cook, Mijo Dadić excelled in the sport he chose and was selected to play for Croatian National Juniors at the Under-16, Under-17 and Under-18 age groups.

Mijo Dadić signed his first professional contract when he turned 19 years old, for his hometown club NK Rijeka, which is the third most successful club in his country. He was tied for 4 years there with NK Rijeka plying in the First Division. Targeted as one for the future, NK Rijeka loaned out the youngster to NK Pomorac in his first season, to gain more experience in the top level competition. The central defender who was occasionally used as a cover in defensive midfield, spent six months there before being sent to NK Orient in the Second Division, also on loan. Following his successful short term stints at both clubs, NK Rijeka recalled Mijo Dadic for the start of his second season there in 2001. Off the field, things did not turn out the way Mijo Dadić expected as he was not paid wages regularly, while on the field he did not get a chance. A new coach from across town took over the reins at NK Rijeka, side-lining Mijo Dadić in favour of players that had followed him there. Hapoel Ranana, promised to free Mijo Dadić of his misery in 2002 following successful trials with the Israeli outfit, but NK Rijeka demanded an astronomical figure of DM1 million (1 million Deutsche Marks = RM2.85 million Ringgit in 2002), causing Hapoel Ranana to balk at the figure and abandon plans of signing Mijo Dadić. Fed-up of his prospects at NK Rijeka with two more years remaining on his contract, Mijo Dadić began the search for other opportunities to venture abroad. He brokered at deal with the club that had owed him USD 100,000 (RM 380,000 in 2002), telling the management of NK Rijeka that he would be willing to forego the amount in return for his International Transfer Certificate (ITC). Mijo Dadic wanted out, and they agreed.

Childhood friend Marin Mikac convinced his compatriot to seek fortune in Malaysia, and Mijo Dadic duly followed in 2004. Together with Marin Mikac, they managed to land a contract with Malaysian Premier League side MK Land FC, under the watchful eye of head coach Khan Hung Meng, joining a team laden with big stars of the Malaysian game such as Marlon Alex James, K. Nanthakumar, Shahrin Majid, Paidiya Rao, M. Chandran amongst others. There was much excitement for club football back then; fighting for honours with the states in the Malaysian League and MK Land FC emerged as a force to be reckoned with. In his first season there, MK Land FC missed out on promotion to the Malaysian Super League, finishing three points behind winners MPPJ FC, as during then only the champion’s gain promotion. It was an almost similar tale the following season in 2005 when MK Land FC finished third in the standings, once more failing to obtain promotion. In 2006, MK Land FC pulled out of the M-League citing financial difficulties, and thus were handed a 5-year ban by Football Association of Malaysia (FAM). Their staff including the players were left in a quandary and Mijo Dadic was forced to head home, due to FAM’s ruling whereby foreign players were not allowed to switch camps immediately within the League, upon completion of their contract, despite him attracting attention from other teams.

Returning to Croatia in 2006, Mijo Dadić played Second Division football with a club from Zagreb. It was a decent club but they too struggled with players’ wages. Fellow countryman Bojan Hodak rescued Mijo Dadić from obscurity in their country, offering the latter a chance to play for another club side, UPB-MyTeam FC in their Malaysian Premier League debut. Mijo Dadic was glad to learn that his former mentor at MK Land FC, Khan Hung Meng also assumed a coaching position at the club, and immediately agreed to come back to Malaysia. It was a remarkable season for UPB-MyTeam FC, chugging their way up the standings to earn promotion to the Malaysian Super League, finishing runner-up. However, Mijo Dadić who played a pivotal part in the first half of the campaign, even scoring UPB-MyTeam FC’s first ever goal in the M-League, was struck by ligament injury in the home match against Sabah FA in April, and missed the rest of the season recuperating.

Dadić will feature in the Malaysian Super League for the first time in yet another debut of sorts for UPB-MyTeam FC. Thoroughly enjoying his time here, he recently signed on an extension to his playing career saying “I give my best all the time, and I hate to lose.”

In Persiba Balikpapan Mijo Dadić was selected to be Captain of team. Then, he moved to Deltras in the Indonesia Super League on 2011/2012 season.

On 13 July 2012, Mijo Dadic moves to Malaysian Super League clubside, Kelantan FA for 6 months to compete in the AFC Cup 2012.

Honours

Club honors
Kelantan
Malaysia Cup (1): 2012
Malaysia FA Cup (1): 2012
Malaysia Super League (1): 2012

References

External links
 Mijo Dadić on pelitabandungraya.co
Profile at 1hnl.net
 Mijo Dadic's Profile at UPB-MyTeam FC's Official Website

1981 births
Living people
Footballers from Rijeka
Association football defenders
Croatian footballers
HNK Rijeka players
NK Pomorac 1921 players
HNK Orijent players
NK Hrvatski Dragovoljac players
UPB-MyTeam FC players
Persiba Balikpapan players
Deltras F.C. players
Kelantan FA players
Pelita Bandung Raya players
NK Opatija players
First Football League (Croatia) players
Malaysia Premier League players
Malaysia Super League players
Liga 1 (Indonesia) players
Indonesian Super League players
Croatian expatriate footballers
Expatriate footballers in Malaysia
Croatian expatriate sportspeople in Malaysia
Expatriate footballers in Indonesia
Croatian expatriate sportspeople in Indonesia

HNK Rijeka non-playing staff